Kharadi is a suburb located in the Eastern Metropolitan Corridor of Pune, India, on the banks of the Mula-Mutha river that serves as a hub for information technology and business parks. Initially, it was referred to as a village however, during recent times with reference to the introduction of the information technology businesses in Kharadi, the suburb has evolved into a major metropolitan corridor for techies in Pune.

Although an IT powerhouse, the banking industry is also making its way into the neighbourhood. It is rapidly developing in terms of residential and office projects. The exponential development of Kharadi in the 2010s has caused demands for a metro station in the area. The possibility of a line connection has been touted by offices and companies, some even willing to contribute funds to the project - similar to IT companies in Bangalore.

History
Kharadi was a village for a larger part of the history of Pune. The initial urban expansion eastwards began from the eastern Pune suburb of Chandan Nagar. The IT boom, beginning in roughly 2005, established major Multinational corporations in the area. Residential projects followed, and development is moving at a rapid pace in the 2020s.

Geography

Location
Kharadi is located in the north-east of Pune. It is approximately 15 minutes from the Pune Airport by car. To its north is Lohegaon; to the south is the Mula-Mutha River and the neighbourhoods of Magarpatta and Hadapsar; to its east is Chandan Nagar, Wadgaonsheri, and Viman Nagar; and to its west is the neighbourhood of Wagholi.

Climate
Kharadi has a hot, semi-arid climate. It is between a tropical wet and dry. The area experiences three seasons: summer, monsoon, and winter. The summers are hot, dry, and clear lasting for 2.5 months. The monsoons are windy, cold, and overcast. The winters last for roughly 2 months, the coldest month of the year being January.

Economy
Kharadi is one of Pune's IT hubs. Companies that have offices in Kharadi include Vodafone, Barclays, TATA, Credit Suisse, UPS, Symantec, Citigroup, Seagate Technology, Mphasis, Veritas Technologies, Zensar, Allianz, Northern Trust, and UBS. Pune's only World Trade Centre is located in the area. The campus has several buildings and is one of India's 25 WTCs. It is a member of the World Trade Centers Association.  

Kharadi was the home of US - based MNC Urban Air Mobility (UAM) Blade (company) vertiport offering daily helicopter service to Mumbai. The travel time from Kharadi to Mumbai was cut down to 35 minutes due to the service. The vertiport was soon relocated to Koregaon Park - a posh, affluent, central Pune neighbourhood.

Culture

Kharadi has been the venue for multiple music festivals in the past. The VH1 Supersonic music festival took place in Kharadi, featuring artists such as Diplo, Marshmello, Machine Gun Kelly and more. Moreover, the popular festival all over India NH7 Weekender chooses Kharadi as its home when the circus makes its way to Pune.

See also
 Hinjawadi
 Magarpatta
 Vimannagar
 Koregaon Park
 Kalyani Nagar

References 

Neighbourhoods in Pune
High-technology business districts in India
Economy of Pune
Software technology parks in Pune